After Hours is the ninth solo studio album by Northern Irish guitarist Gary Moore, released in 1992. The album features guest contributions from B.B. King and Albert Collins. It peaked at number four on the UK Albums Chart, making it Moore's highest-charting album in the UK.

Track listing
All tracks written by Gary Moore, except where noted.

Personnel
 Gary Moore – guitar, vocals
 Will Lee, Bob Daisley, Andy Pyle, Johnny B. Gaydon – bass
 Graham Walker, Anton Fig – drums 
 Tommy Eyre – keyboards 
 Martin Drover – trumpet
 Frank Mead, Nick Pentelow, Nick Payn – saxophone
 Andrew Love, Wayne Jackson – The Memphis Horns 
 Carol Kenyon, Linda Taylor – vocals
 Richard Morgan – oboe

 B.B. King – vocals and guitar on "Since I Met You Baby"
 Albert Collins – vocals and guitar on "The Blues is Alright", guitar on "Once in a Blue Mood"

Singles
"Separate Ways" (October 1992)
"Since I Met You Baby" (August 1992)
"Story of the Blues" (May 1992)
"Only Fool in Town" (USA Only)
"Cold Day in Hell" (February 1992)

Charts

Weekly charts

Year-end charts

Certifications

References

Gary Moore albums
1992 albums
Charisma Records albums